Princeton is the largest city in and the county seat of Patoka Township, Gibson County, Indiana, United States. The population was 8,301 at the 2020 United States Census, and it is part of the greater Evansville, Indiana, Metropolitan Area.

History 
In 1800, the Indiana Territory was created with Vincennes (Knox County) as its capital. The rich farmlands in the southwest of the territory with access to the Ohio River attracted many pioneers and settlers to the area, one of whom was an Irish immigrant named William Prince. Born in 1772, he immigrated to America at the age of 22. He later became a Gibson County Commissioner and the county seat of Princeton is named after him.

The year 1813 saw the move of the territorial capital east from Vincennes to Corydon and the creation of Gibson County. Gibson had previously been part of the vast Knox County which covered all the land of southwestern Indiana, bordered by the Wabash and Ohio Rivers. By early 1814, settlers to this area were asking for a "seat of justice," or county seat. Captain William Prince was one of four commissioners who located the seat at the half-way stand on the Evansville and Vincennes stage line. By drawing of lots, commissioners decided to name the town after Captain Prince.

The iconic symbol of Princeton is the Gibson County Courthouse, a structure built in the Second Empire style. It has been featured as a collectible figurine by the Department 56 Original Snow Village. A post office was established in Princeton as early as 1816. The local newspaper, the Princeton Daily Clarion, was first published in 1846. Lyles Station, a small community just west of Princeton, was founded by freed Tennessee slave Joshua Lyles in 1849. It served as a haven for runaway slaves who braved the Ohio River on a northern trek towards freedom.

The Wabash and Erie Canal ran through the nearby towns of Francisco and Port Gibson, providing a means of reaching distant markets with goods from Princeton. The 1850s saw the advance of the railway system through Indiana, spelling doom for the canal system. The Evansville and Terre Haute Railroad line was run through town in 1852 and the Princeton Depot was constructed in 1875. The railroad became a boon to Princeton's industry as the Southern Railway Shops were constructed on the edge of town in 1892. Other industry included the Heinz plant (because of the area's famed tomatoes being good for ketchup making) and the Princeton Coal Mine.

In 1925, the Tri-State Tornado left its mark on the town. After hitting Griffin and narrowly missing Owensville to the southwest, the tornado devastated the southern side of Princeton, killing 44 people, injuring another 146 and leaving hundreds homeless. Princeton was the historic storm's final victim, as the tornado dissipated about 10 miles to the northeast near Petersburg. The deadliest tornado in US history claimed 95 lives in Indiana with almost half of those in Princeton.

Toyota Motor Company opened a truck manufacturing plant between Princeton and Fort Branch in 1998 to build a new full-size pickup and SUV. Toyota significantly increased production at the plant in 2000. As of 2016, the plant builds two SUVs and a van.

The Gibson County Courthouse and Welborn-Ross House are listed on the National Register of Historic Places.

Geography
Princeton is located at  (38.353617, -87.570541).

Climate
The climate in this area is characterized by hot, humid summers and generally mild to cool winters.  According to the Köppen climate classification system, Princeton has a humid subtropical climate, abbreviated "Cfa" on climate maps.

Demographics

2020 census
In the 2020 census, the population of Princeton was 8,301. There were 3,552 households. White population was 89.9%, of which 88.2% were not Hispanic or Latino; Black or African American alone 6.8%; two or more races 3.1%; Hispanic or Latino 1.7%; and Asian alone 0.1%.

2010 census
As of the census of 2010, there were 8,644 people, 3,516 households, and 2,129 families living in the city. The racial makeup of the city was 90.4% White, 4.6% African American, 0.2% Native American, 0.7% Asian, 1.1% from other races, and 3.0% from two or more races. Hispanic or Latino of any race were 2.5% of the population.

There were 3,516 households, of which 32.8% had children under the age of 18 living with them, 41.0% were married couples living together, 15.1% had a female householder with no husband present, 4.5% had a male householder with no wife present, and 39.4% were non-families. 33.8% of all households were made up of individuals, and 14.1% had someone living alone who was 65 years of age or older. The average household size was 2.34 and the average family size was 2.99.

The median age in the city was 37.2 years. 25% of residents were under the age of 18; 8.9% were between the ages of 18 and 24; 25.5% were from 25 to 44; 24.6% were from 45 to 64; and 16.1% were 65 years of age or older. The gender makeup of the city was 47.7% male and 52.3% female.

2000 census
As of the census of 2000, there were 8,175 people, 3,451 households, and 2,146 families living in the city. The racial makeup of the city was 91.36% White, 5.36% African American, 0.17% Native American, 1.26% Asian, 0.01% Pacific Islander, 0.39% from other races, and 1.44% from two or more races. Hispanic or Latino of any race were 1.13% of the population.

There were 3,451 households, out of which 28.9% had children under the age of 18 living with them, 44.1% were married couples living together, 13.8% had a female householder with no husband present, and 37.8% were non-families. 33.0% of all households were made up of individuals, and 15.9% had someone living alone who was 65 years of age or older. The average household size was 2.28 and the average family size was 2.88.

In the city, the age distribution of the population shows 24.1% under the age of 18, 8.8% from 18 to 24, 27.4% from 25 to 44, 20.6% from 45 to 64, and 19.1% who were 65 years of age or older. The median age was 38 years. For every 100 females, there were 87.2 males. For every 100 females age 18 and over, there were 83.0 males.

The median income for a household in the city was $26,689, and the median income for a family was $37,308. Males had a median income of $28,076 versus $19,825 for females. The per capita income for the city was $15,049. About 15.0% of families and 15.8% of the population were below the poverty line, including 23.2% of those under age 18 and 11.2% of those age 65 or over.

Economy 

Major employers in Princeton include Toyota Motor Manufacturing Indiana (TMMI), located 3 miles to the south, nearly halfway between Princeton and Fort Branch, where the Toyota Sequoia, Sienna and Highlander are manufactured; and Hansen Corporation. Many Toyota suppliers have facilities between the plant site and the city. These suppliers include EnovaPremier, Vuteq, TISA, Millennium Steel, Gibson County Quality Assurance, and Product Action International. All of these facilities were either built or converted from other uses to furnish supplies, part and services to TMMI. Siemens at one point had research and manufacturing facilities in Princeton, but the manufacturing plant was closed in the early 1990s and the research facility was closed soon after. In 2008 the former Siemens property was acquired by Menards and demolished. A Menards store currently occupies the former Siemens site.

Toyota's announcement in late 1995 that it would be building a $1 billion manufacturing facility in Princeton created an economic boom, as many of Toyota's suppliers also built plants in or near Princeton to minimize shipping and logistical expenses.  Additionally, many service businesses located in town to satisfy the needs of the employees, many of whom would be relocating to the Princeton area from elsewhere.  However, the arrival of Toyota was not without controversy.  Many objected to the ten-year tax abatement offered as part of the incentive package to induce Toyota to locate in the area, and others were worried by the fact that it would likely not be unionized (as of 2019, it is not).

More recently, many retail and restaurant chains such as Applebee's, Sears, and Menards have opened locations in Princeton. Analysts attribute much of this to the planned extension of Interstate 69—at the time many of these businesses were sited in Princeton, the leading proposal for the project was to upgrade U.S. 41 (it was later decided to build Interstate 69 over a new-terrain route, which would travel between nearby Oakland City and Francisco).

Princeton is served by two freight rail lines: CSX and Norfolk Southern. For people who enjoy watching trains online, Virtual Railfan, via YouTube, provides northbound and southbound cams along the tracks at W. Broadway St. for 24-hour viewing when the cameras are in operation. The cams are hosted by the Gibson County Visitors and Tourism Bureau. Greyhound Bus Lines stops at curbside to pick up and discharge passengers outside a Burger King restaurant at 2740 W. Broadway St.

Government 

Princeton is governed by a mayor and a five-member city council, all of whom are elected for four-year terms.  The current mayor is Brad Schmitt, Republican as of January 1, 2016. City functions are divided among the Police Department, Sanitation Department, Parks and Recreation Department, Street Department, Sewer Department, Water Department, Water Treatment Plant, and the Princeton Fire Territory (formed from a merger between the Princeton Fire Department and the Patoka Township Fire Department in early 2006).

Like most Midwestern small towns, Princeton's citizens are generally socially conservative. However, its largely blue-collar population—including factory workers, skilled tradesmen, railroad employees, and coal miners—and significant union membership means that there is no general bias towards either the Republican or Democratic Party; however, Princeton's Democrats tend to be considerably more socially conservative than those in other parts of the country.

Parks and recreation 

Princeton has three main city parks, administered by the Department of Parks and Recreation. Lafayette Park, on the city's north side, is the largest. It features a fishing pond, shelter houses, a playground, an open general-purpose recreation area, and a stage for public performances. The city swimming pool is adjacent to Lafayette Park, as is Kiddie Land, a playground for very young children. Gil Hodges field, where the Princeton Community High School baseball team plays its home games, is also located on the park property.

The other two city parks are South Side Park and East End Park

Media
Radio
FM 98.1 WRAY-FM – Country Music / Programs
FM 94.3 WRAY – FM-based repeater for AM 1250
AM 1250 WRAY – News / Talk / Programs

Newspapers
Princeton Daily Clarion – Tue-Fri Circulation

Education 
 North Gibson School Corporation
 Princeton Community High School
 Princeton Community Middle School
 Princeton Community Intermediate School
 Princeton Community Primary School
 St. Joseph Catholic Elementary School
 Bethel Christian School

The town has a lending library, the Princeton Public Library.

Notable people

 Michael A. Banks – author, born in Princeton in 1951
 Gary Burton (born in Anderson, Indiana) – jazz vibraphonist
 Gary Denbo – Miami Marlins Vice President of Player Development and Scouting
 Allen J. Flannigan – Wisconsin State Assemblyman
 Gil Hodges – professional baseball player
Algernon Brashear Jackson, doctor
 Jeron Criswell King – actor and alleged psychic, born in Princeton in 1907
 David J. Lawson – pastor, played a key role establishing and developing Africa University,  the only U.M.C. university in Africa.
 Dave Niehaus – Seattle Mariners play-by-play announcer
 Michael E. Pegram (born in Fort Knox, Kentucky) – thoroughbred owner; winner of 1998 Kentucky Derby, 1998 Preakness Stakes winner Real Quiet and 2010 Preakness Stakes winner Lookin At Lucky
 John S. Poland, U.S. Army brigadier general
 William Prince (born in Ireland) – politician, town's namesake.
 Orville Redenbacher (born in Brazil, Indiana) – popcorn icon
 Jamie Rowe (rock- heavy metal vocalist)
 Dave Thomas (born in Atlantic City, New Jersey) – founder of Wendy's
 Mack V. Wright – actor and film director
 Brandon Hatten – author
 Taylor Caniff – Internet personality
 Jackie Young – American basketball player, chosen first for the 2019 WNBA Las Vegas Aces team

Highways
  U.S. Route 41 Evansville – Terre Haute
  State Road 64 Known as Broadway Avenue for its entire length in Princeton. Mount Carmel – .
  State Road 65 Known as Broadway Avenue for first two thirds of its length up to the Courthouse Square, then turns onto Main Street for the remaining third. Heads for Petersburg or Owensville via Indiana 64.

Major roads
 Broadway Avenue State Road 64 for east half, State Road 64/65 for west half where it becomes a four-lane road. Because Broadway Avenue does not have an overpass, it is often blocked as over 80 trains pass through town on a daily basis, sometimes with two trains passing each other over the intersection.
 Brumfield Avenue Runs parallel to Broadway one to four blocks north, depending on location. Site of one of the two railroad overpasses over the CSX/Norfolk Southern junction running through Princeton.  
 Embree Street Though obscure at its beginning at Broadway, Embree Street is one of the major thoroughfares used in reaching Princeton Community High School, now known as Princeton Community Middle School. At the junction of Embree and Brumfield there is a roundabout, completed in 2009 to ease flow through the intersection as trains pass through town. Embree is also frequently used to bypass the railroad to get to the Brumfield Ave. Overpass from the square. The Gibson County Fairgrounds are also located along Embree Street immediately before the high school/middle school complex.
 Main Street Signed as State Road 65 north of the Gibson County Courthouse Square, Main Street is the main north-south thoroughfare in Princeton. Main Street was also once signed as U.S. Route 41 for nearly all of its length through Princeton. A two-year widening and rehabilitation project was completed in 2008, making what was once one of the most unpleasant-looking streets in Princeton the most presentable. Main Street is the site of the other railroad overpass in Princeton. The current campus of Princeton Community High School, opened in 2012, is located along Main Street.
 Mulberry/Spring Street Bypass often used to get to Princeton's South Side while avoiding the stoplights on the Courthouse Square. An overpass was considered for Mulberry in 2007, but was rejected due to the costs involved. Mulberry and Spring Streets meet on a sometimes hazardous curve that sits almost 15 feet over surrounding terrain.
 Richland Creek Drive Used mainly to reach the new Menards hardware store. Around a curve from Menards are two new townhouse projects and a new Deaconess Hospital Clinic as well as a possible new strip mall. Richland Creek meets U.S. Route 41 about 200 feet south of the Broadway (State Roads 64/65) – US 41 Cloverleaf. At the northern end of Richland Creek Drive is Sherman Drive and the Gibson General Hospital campus.
 North Prince Street Location of Dick Clark's Family Restaurant (702 North Prince). The street runs parallel with Main Street, but has a number of 4-way stops near the center of town.
 State Street Similar to Prince street, State Street runs parallel to Broadway, forming the north end of the square. State street is often used to bypass the light at Main and Brumfield, or to reach Embree Street to bypass the trains. Like Prince Street, State Street also has a number of 4-way stops near the center of town, one of which is with Prince. It forks with Broadway on the far east end of town, near the old middle school.

Sister City 
 Tahara, Aichi, Japan since August 8, 2002

References

External links

 City website
 Gibson County Now
 City-Data.com

 
Populated places established in 1814
Cities in Indiana
Cities in Gibson County, Indiana
County seats in Indiana
Communities of Southwestern Indiana
1814 establishments in the United States